H. salicifolia may refer to:
 Hakea salicifolia, the willow-leaved Hakea, a plant indigenous to New South Wales, Australia
 Hebe salicifolia, a synonym of Veronica salicifolia, the koromiko, a flowering plant found throughout the South Island of New Zealand and in Chile
 Heimia salicifolia, the sinicuichi, a shrub
 Heteromeles salicifolia, a synonym for H. artutifolia, the toyon, a common perennial shrub native to California, USA and the extreme northwest of Mexico
 Heteropsis salicifolia, Kunth, a plant in the genus Heteropsis
 Hippophae salicifolia, the willow-leaved sea-buckthorn, a plant species in the genus Hippophae
 Hygrophila salicifolia, a plant species in the genus Hygrophila
 Hypoestes salicifolia, a plant species in the genus Hypoestes

See also 
 Salicifolia (disambiguation)